Tapovan Maharaj (1889–1957) was a Hindu sage and Vedanta scholar.

Life
Swami Tapovan Maharaj is one of the most renowned saints of the 20th century. He was a contemporary of Swami Sivananda Maharaj who was the Guru of Swami Chinmayananda Maharaj.

Swami Tapovan Maharaj was born in 1889 on the Suklapaksha Ekadashi day of Mārgasirsa month. His mother, Kunjamma, belonged to an ancient aristocratic Nair Hindu family at Mudappallur in Palghat Taluk of Kerala. His father, Achutan, belonged to Kotuvayur in Kerala.

Based on his date of birth, the infant's horoscope, cast in accordance with family tradition, revealed "unusually contrary indications of huge prosperity and abject poverty".

Born with purvashrama name Subrahmanyan, he authored two books on his travels through the Himalayas: "Wanderings in the Himalayas" (Himagiri Viharam) and "Kailasa Yatra."  Tapovan Maharaj exhibited a deep love for nature and his accounts of his travels demonstrate such.  His autobiography, written in Sanskrit is titled "Ishvara Darshana". He died in the early hours of 16 January 1957, which was the day of Pausha Purnima according to Hindu calendar.

Publications

 (Originally published in Malayalam in 1928)

See also
 Swami Sundaranand

References

External links

  (7:04, Youtube)
 (7:04, Youtube; first 3:00 on Chinmayananda)

Advaitin philosophers
Indian Hindu monks
Vedanta
Indian male writers
20th-century Hindu philosophers and theologians
Writers from Kerala
Malayali people
1889 births
1957 deaths
Hindu studies scholars
People from Palakkad district
20th-century Indian philosophers